Jalal Uddin is a Bangladesh Nationalist Party politician and the former Member of Parliament of Dhaka-32.

Career
Uddin was elected to parliament from Dhaka-32 as a Bangladesh Nationalist Party candidate in 1979.

References

Bangladesh Nationalist Party politicians
1987 deaths
2nd Jatiya Sangsad members